is a Japanese politician of the Liberal Democratic Party, a member of the House of Representatives in the Diet (national legislature). A native of Narita, Chiba and graduate of Hosei University, he had served in the assembly of Chiba Prefecture since 1991. He was elected to the House of Representatives for the first time in 1993.

Yukio Jutsukawa failed to get reelected and has since retired from the world of politics. It is currently not known if he will be trying to make a comeback into politics.

References

External links 
 Official website in Japanese.

Members of the House of Representatives (Japan)
Living people
1943 births
People from Narita, Chiba
Liberal Democratic Party (Japan) politicians
21st-century Japanese politicians